The  was an early class of submarines of the Imperial Japanese Navy, and were essentially British C-class submarines, which had been imported for evaluation and reverse engineering.

Background
Following its experiment during and after the Russo-Japanese War with modified versions of the Holland-class vessels designed in the United States, the Imperial Japanese Navy turned to the United Kingdom, which had continued development of the Holland design with 13 vessels in its , 11 vessels in its B class and 38 vessels in its C class. The Japanese government contracted Vickers at Barrow-in-Furness for two vessels, which were laid down just after  towards the end of the C-class production run for the Royal Navy. The completed vessels were shipped to Japan on a specially modified cargo vessel.

With limited endurance and only a ten percent reserve of buoyancy over their surface displacement, The Ha-1 class were poor surface vessels, but their spindle shaped hull made for good underwater performance compared to their contemporaries. They also had three times the displacement of their predecessors in the Imperial Japanese Navy, and were the first submarines considered usable as combat vessels by the Japanese.

Design and description
The British C-class submarines were similar in design to the preceding B class and were intended for coastal patrol work and harbor defense. They had a petrol engine for surface propulsion and batteries for underwater propulsion. The design was intended to overcome the limitations of speed, endurance and seakeeping that had affected earlier Holland-type submarines, such as the Type 1 and Type 6 submarines in Japanese service, and were substantially larger. Their additional size increased their buoyancy and made them far less liable to unexpectedly plunge beneath the surface in bad weather. The addition of a deck casing above the hull also improved their seakeeping abilities. The design lacked any internal bulkheads which exposed the crew to the petrol engine's exhaust fumes. Mice were used to detect any concentrations of carbon monoxide inside the hull. Ventilation was provided for the batteries, but none for the crew's living area. No accommodations were provided for the crew and they were forced to improvise while at sea. In recognition of this issue, the crew's endurance was only expected to be four days during the summer and three days during the winter.

Propulsion
This engine was developed by Vickers from the  Wolseley engine used in the A-class.

Armament
The Ha-1-class boats were armed with a pair of 18-inch (457 mm) torpedo tubes side-by-side in the bow and angled slightly downwards. Space was provided for a pair of reloads.

Ships in class
, laid down 3 August 1907; launched 19 May 1908; commissioned 26 February 1909 as Submersible No.8; reclassified as 2nd class submersible on 4 August 1916, reclassified as 3rd class submarine on 1 April 1919; renamed Ha-1 on 15 June 1923, decommissioned on 1 April 1924.
, laid down 3 August 1907; launched 19 May 1908; commissioned 9 March 1909 as Submersible No.9; reclassified as 2nd class submersible on 4 August 1916, reclassified as 3rd class submarine on 1 April 1919; renamed Ha-2 on 15 June 1923; decommissioned on 1 April 1924.

Notes

References

External links

Battleships-cruisers.co.uk site
Britsub.net

Submarine classes
Submarines of the Imperial Japanese Navy
Ships built in Barrow-in-Furness
1909 ships